Bagdogra Railway Station  is one of the railway station that serves Western Siliguri Metropolitan Areas in Darjeeling district in the Indian state of West Bengal. This station consists of six platforms, among them five broad-gauge platforms and one metre-gauge platform. This station lies in Katihar–Siliguri line and New Jalpaiguri - Thakurganj Line Via Bagdogra and Rangapani .

References

External links
https://indiarailinfo.com/station/blog/bagdogra-bora/5312

 Railway stations in Siliguri
Railway stations in West Bengal
Railway stations in Darjeeling district
Transport in Siliguri